Cadavres is a Canadian comedy thriller film, directed by Érik Canuel and released in 2009. It is a film adaptation of the 1998 novel Cadavres by François Barcelo, a tragicomedy about the deadly feelings that unite a brother and sister who have nothing in common.

Plot
One Halloween, the alcoholic mother of good-for-nothing Raymond suddenly dies, and he throws her body in a ditch. Repenting, he calls his sister Angèle, an actress who he has not seen for ten years, to help find the corpse. But the corpse they bring back in the ruined family home is not that of their mother. The brother and the sister start a sinister adventure involving two gangsters in dire straits, two chilling dealers, a dishonest artist agent, a terribly stupid cop, and a horde of pigs.

Cast

Release
The film was released February 20, 2009. It received mixed criticism and failed to create substantial revenue at the box-office.

References

External links

 
 
 Érik Canuel returns with Cadavres

2009 films
Canadian thriller films
Films directed by Érik Canuel
2009 thriller films
French-language Canadian films
2000s Canadian films